Cândido Coelho Tavares (30 December 1911 – 18 June 1997) was a Portuguese football goalkeeper and manager.

With a career spanning over a decade, Tavares represented mainly Casa Pia and Benfica, coaching the latter afterwards and winning a Portuguese Cup.

Playing career
Born in Seixal, Setúbal District, Tavares started playing with Casa Pia A.C. in 1931 and moved to Lusitano G.C. the following year. In 1935 he returned to his previous club, subsequently signing with S.L. Benfica.

At the latter side, Tavares eventually beat competition from Augusto Amaro and Pedro Conceição position, playing all of the league games in his first season, and interchanging with Amaro in his second year. He then had a third spell at Casa Pia, retiring in 1942 at the age of 31 with União Sportiva in Azores.

Coaching career
After retiring, Tavares started working as a fitness coach, having his first experience as manager in December 1951 at Benfica, when Ted Smith left unexpectedly. He was still able to guide them to a Taça de Portugal triumph against Sporting Clube de Portugal on 15 June 1952 and, the next year, was appointed at Vitória de Guimarães, which he led to two consecutive eighth-place finishes in the Primeira Liga.

Subsequently, Tavares managed Lusitano de Évora, S.C.U. Torreense and G.D. Fabril, always in the top flight. He also had a small stint in the Portugal national team as fitness coach, in 1956.

Managerial statistics

Honours
Taça de Portugal: 1951–52

References
General
 

Specific

External links 
 

1911 births
1997 deaths
People from Seixal
Portuguese footballers
Association football goalkeepers
Primeira Liga players
Casa Pia A.C. players
Lusitano G.C. players
S.L. Benfica footballers
Portuguese football managers
S.L. Benfica managers
Vitória S.C. managers
Sportspeople from Setúbal District